Alfa Romeo I (formerly Shockwave, Rambler, currently La Bête) is a  fixed keel maxi yacht, launched 2002, which placed first in the 2002 Sydney-Hobart race and the 2003 Giraglia Rolex cup regatta.

She was designed by Reichel/Pugh, and built by McConaghy Boats, Sydney, Australia, using carbon fibre composite construction. Southern Spars of Auckland, New Zealand, built her mast. She has a fixed bulb keel. Launched in July 2002, she won the 2003 Giraglia Rolex Cup regatta, one of Europe's most prestigious regattas. She was first to finish in the 2003 Fastnet race, although she did not win on handicapped time. In 2002, she was first to finish in the Sydney to Hobart Yacht Race. She was first to finish in at least 74 races around the world.

Sponsorship
The Alfa Romeo yachts owned by Neville Crichton were sponsored by Alfa Romeo Automobiles S.p.A. of Turin, Italy. They own the Alfa Romeo name and other intellectual properties such as logos, emblems (used on Alfa Romeo III).

See also
Alfa Romeo II
Alfa Romeo III
Wild Oats XI

References

External links
Alfa Romeo Yacht Racing Team site
Alfa Romeo Yacht Racing Team news releases
Alfa Romeo II build details
2009 Transpac race crew list
Maxi Yacht Rolex Cup Victory in Sardinia
Giraglia Rolex Cup promotional information
Alfa Romeo II demonstrating speed at Malta Rolex Middle Sea Race 2006
Deck layout and detail photos of Alfa Romeo II

Ships built in New South Wales
Individual sailing yachts
2000s sailing yachts
Sydney to Hobart Yacht Race yachts
Alfa Romeo
Fastnet race
Sailing yachts designed by Reichel/Pugh
Sailing yachts built in Australia
Sailing yachts of Australia
Sailing yachts of the United States
Sailing yachts of the United Kingdom
Fastnet Race yachts
Maxi yachts
Sailboat types built by McConaghy Boats